Longitarsus holsaticus is a species of black coloured beetle in the subfamily Galerucinae that is native to Europe.

References

H
Beetles described in 1758
Beetles of Europe
Taxa named by Carl Linnaeus